is a railway station of the Chūō Main Line, East Japan Railway Company (JR East) in Yamato-Hajikano, in the city of Kōshū, Yamanashi Prefecture, Japan.

Lines
Kai-Yamato Station is served by the Chūō Main Line, and is 106.5 kilometers from the terminus of the line at Tokyo Station.

Station layout
The station consists of a single side platform and a single island platform. The platforms are located in a cutting, with the station building on ground level, and accessed via an overpass. The station is unattended.

Platforms

History 
The JGR became the JNR (Japanese National Railways) after the end of World War II. Scheduled freight services were discontinued from April 1966. The current station building was completed in November 1966. With the dissolution and privatization of the JNR on April 1, 1987, the station came under the control of the East Japan Railway Company. The station was named to its present name on April 1, 1993. Automated turnstiles using the Suica IC Card system came into operation from October 16, 2004.

Passenger statistics
In fiscal 2013, the station was used by an average of 143 passengers daily (boarding passengers only).

Surrounding area
former Yamato village hall

See also
 List of railway stations in Japan

References

 Miyoshi Kozo. Chuo-sen Machi to eki Hyaku-niju nen. JT Publishing (2009)

External links

JR East Kai-Yamato Station

Railway stations in Yamanashi Prefecture
Railway stations in Japan opened in 1903
Chūō Main Line
Stations of East Japan Railway Company
Kōshū, Yamanashi